William O'Brien  is an Irish archaeologist well known for his research on the evolution of Bronze Age societies and the appearance of metallurgy in Ireland. O'Brien is a  professor at University College Cork and an elected member of the Royal Irish Academy.

Biography
O'Brien completed doctoral research at the University College Cork in 1987 on the emergence of prehistoric copper mining. He lectured for 16 years in the Department of Archaeology, NUI Galway. Research interests include the Chalcolithic and Bronze Age in Ireland, early mining and metallurgy in Atlantic Europe, upland archaeology, hillforts and all aspects of monumentality in the later prehistoric period. He has a particular focus on south-west Ireland as a region in prehistory, where he has conducted numerous research excavations.

Selected publications

References 

 

Prehistorians
Irish archaeologists
20th-century archaeologists
21st-century archaeologists
Academics of University College Cork
Alumni of University College Cork 
People from County Cork
Living people
1961 births
Members of the Royal Irish Academy